Strioterebrum is an extinct genus of sea snails, marine gastropod mollusks in the family Terebridae, the auger snails.

Species
 † Strioterebrum acuminatum (Borson, 1820) 

Species brought into synonymy
 Strioterebrum angelli J. Gibson-Smith & W. Gibson-Smith, 1984: synonym of Euterebra angelli (J. Gibson-Smith & W. Gibson-Smith, 1984)
 Strioterebrum arabellum (Thiele, 1925): synonym of Punctoterebra arabella (Thiele, 1925) 
 Strioterebrum ballina (Hedley, 1915): synonym of Punctoterebra ballina (Hedley, 1915)
 Strioterebrum caliginosum (Deshayes, 1859): synonym of Punctoterebra caliginosa (Deshayes, 1859)
 Strioterebrum fuscotaeniatum (Thiele, 1925): synonym of Punctoterebra fuscotaeniata (Thiele, 1925)
 Strioterebrum grayi (E.A. Smith, 1877): synonym of Terebra grayi E. A. Smith, 1877
 Strioterebrum illustre Malcolm & Terryn, 2012: synonym of Punctoterebra illustris (Malcolm & Terryn, 2012)
 Strioterebrum isabella (Thiele, 1925): synonym of Punctoterebra isabella (Thiele, 1925)
 Strioterebrum japonicum (E.A. Smith, 1873): synonym of Punctoterebra japonica (E. A. Smith, 1873)
 Strioterebrum lividum (Reeve, 1860): synonym of Punctoterebra livida (Reeve, 1860)
 Strioterebrum nitidum (Hinds, 1844): synonym of Punctoterebra nitida (Hinds, 1844)
 Strioterebrum onslowensis Petuch, 1974: synonym of Terebra dislocata (Say, 1822)
 Strioterebrum paucincisum (Bratcher, 1988): synonym of Punctoterebra paucincisa (Bratcher, 1988)
 Strioterebrum pedroanum: synonym of Terebra pedroana Dall, 1908
 Strioterebrum plumbeum (Quoy & Gaimard, 1833): synonym of Punctoterebra plumbea (Quoy & Gaimard, 1833)
 Strioterebrum quadrispiralis (Weisbord, 1962): synonym of Euterebra angelli (J. Gibson-Smith & W. Gibson-Smith, 1984)
 Strioterebrum reticulare Pecchiolo in Sacco, 1891: synonym of Terebra reticularis (Pecchioli in Sacco, 1891)
 Strioterebrum sanjuanense (Pilsbry & Lowe, 1932): synonym of Neoterebra sanjuanensis (Pilsbry & H. N. Lowe, 1932)
 Strioterebrum sorrentense (Aubry, 1999): synonym of Gradaterebra sorrentensis (Aubry, 1999)
 Strioterebrum swainsoni (Deshayes, 1859): synonym of Punctoterebra swainsoni (Deshayes, 1859)
 Strioterebrum trispiralis (Weisbord, 1962): synonym of Euterebra angelli (J. Gibson-Smith & W. Gibson-Smith, 1984)
 Strioterebrum varia Bozzetti, 2008: synonym of Strioterebrum varium Bozzetti, 2008
 Strioterebrum weisbordi J. Gibson-Smith & W. Gibson-Smith, 1984: synonym of Terebra dislocata (Say, 1822)
 Strioterebrum wilkinsi Dance & Eames, 1966: synonym of Euterebra fuscobasis (E.A. Smith, 1877)
 Strioterebrum varia Bozzetti, 2008: synonym of Partecosta varia (Bozzetti, 2008)
 Strioterebrum varium Bozzetti, 2008: synonym of Partecosta varia (Bozzetti, 2008)

References

 Terryn Y. (2007). Terebridae: A Collectors Guide. Conchbooks & NaturalArt. 59pp + plates.

External links
 Sacco F. (1891). I Molluschi dei Terreni Terziarii del Piemonte e della Liguria. Parte X. (Cassididae (aggiunte), Terebridae e Pusionellidae). Carlo Clausen, Torino, 68 pp., 2 pls
 Fedosov, A. E.; Malcolm, G.; Terryn, Y.; Gorson, J.; Modica, M. V.; Holford, M.; Puillandre, N. (2020). Phylogenetic classification of the family Terebridae (Neogastropoda: Conoidea). Journal of Molluscan Studies

Terebridae